Tràng Định is a rural district of Lạng Sơn province in the Northeastern region of Vietnam. As of 2003, the district had a population of 62,869. The district capital lies at Thất Khê.

Administrative divisions
1 town: Thất Khê

22 communes: Khánh Long, Đoàn Kết, Cao Minh, Tân Yên, Vĩnh Tiến, Tân Tiến, Bắc Ái, Kim Đồng, Chí Minh, Chi Lăng, Đề Thám, Hùng Sơn Hùng Việt, Kháng Chiến, Đại Đồng, Tri Phương, Quốc Khánh, Đội Cấn, Tân Minh, Trung Thành, Quốc Việt, Đào Viên

References

Districts of Lạng Sơn province
Lạng Sơn province